Mitzi...Roarin' in the 20s is a 1976 Emmy Award winning television special starring Mitzi Gaynor.

Overview
The variety show included music and comedy and guest starred Carl Reiner, Linda Hopkins and Ken Berry. It was produced by Jack Bean, Tom Biener and Harry Waterson; and directed by Brian Bartholomew and Keaton S. Walker.

Awards
Costume designer Bob Mackie won an Emmy for "Outstanding Achievement in Costume Design for Music-Variety". John Freschi won an Emmy for "Outstanding Achievement in Lighting Direction".

References

External links

1976 television specials
1970s American television specials
Music television specials
CBS television specials